Critical Software is a Portuguese international information systems and software company, headquartered in Coimbra. The company was established in 1998, from the University of Coimbra's business incubator and technology transfer centre, Instituto Pedro Nunes (IPN). The company has other offices in Porto and Lisbon (Portugal), Southampton (United Kingdom), Munich (Germany) and California (United States).

Critical Software develops systems and software services for safety, mission and business-critical applications in several markets, including aerospace, defense, automotive, railway, telecoms, finance, and energy & utilities. Core competencies include system planning and analysis, system design and development, embedded and real-time systems, command & control systems, security and infrastructure, systems integration, business intelligence, independent software verification & validation, UxD, AI, digital transformation and smart meter testing.

Critical Software's delivery unit was the first in Portugal to be rated at CMMI Maturity Level 5. The company is one of a few dozen organizations in the world which have both waterfall and agile software development units rated at Maturity Level 5.

Critical Group
The Critical Group comprises a series of technology companies, many of which were formed from ideas originally developed within Critical Software.

 Critical Materials develops products that provide diagnostics and prognostics for critical structural systems. The company was acquired by the original co-founders of the company and rebranded Stratosphere S.A.
 onCaring is a technology company that helps seniors living in long-term care across Europe, the United States, and Brazil.
 Critical Links provides purpose-built solutions to simplify the delivery of digitized content to schools.
 Retmarker provides software for screening and progression monitoring of retinal diseases.
 Critical Manufacturing provides automation and manufacturing software for high-tech industries. The company was acquired by ASMPT in 2018.
 Watchful Software provided software that kept sensitive information safe from disclosure or security breaches. Symantec acquired it in 2017.

External links
Official site
Critical Software S.A., BusinessWeek
Achievements Small & Medium Sized Enterprises, European Space Agency
Critical Software Shows Portugal Can Grow, Forbes
Critical Software – Pioneers, Up Magazine

Notes and references 

 
Software companies of Portugal
Portuguese brands